ABC Bank (Uganda), whose full name is ABC Capital Bank Uganda Limited,  is a commercial bank in Uganda and licensed by the Bank of Uganda, the central bank and national banking regulator.

Overview
The bank provides banking services to large corporations, small-to-medium-sized businesses (SMEs), as well as individuals. As of December 2020, the bank's total assets were valued at about UGX:62.14 billion, with shareholders' equity of about UGX:28.837 billion.

History
ABC Capital Bank was founded in 1992 as Capital Finance Corporation Limited (CFCL), a Tier III Ugandan Financial Institution, under the licensure and supervision of the Bank of Uganda. In 1999, CFCL established a wholly owned subsidiary, CFC Forex Bureau. In 2008, CFCL signed a memorandum of understanding with ABC Bank (Kenya), identifying the Kenyan institution as a strategic investor in CFCL in the latter's efforts to transform into a commercial bank. On 26 February 2010, following the acquisition of a commercial banking license from the Bank of Uganda, CFCL rebranded as ABC Capital Bank.

Ownership
ABC Bank (Kenya) is an investor in ABC Bank (Uganda). As of September 2019, the shareholding in ABC Capital Bank, is summarized in the table below:

Branch network
As of December 2020, ABC Bank (Uganda) maintained networked branches at the following locations: (1) Main Branch - Colline House, 4C Pilkington Road, Kampala, (2) Luwum Street Branch - Pioneer Mansion, 11 Luwum Street, Kampala, (3) Kikuubo Branch - Fami Plaza, 21 Nakivubo Road, Kampala.

See also

 List of banks in Uganda
 Banking in Uganda

References

External links
   Official website
 ABC Bank (Kenya) Website
  Bank of Uganda Homepage
  ABC Bank Goes To Uganda

Banks of Uganda
Banks established in 1993
1993 establishments in Uganda
Companies based in Kampala